Sergio Arturo Posadas Lara (born 12 August 1963) is a Mexican politician affiliated with the Institutional Revolutionary Party. As of 2014 he served as Deputy of the LIX Legislature of the Mexican Congress as a plurinominal representative.

References

1951 births
Living people
Politicians from Tamaulipas
Members of the Chamber of Deputies (Mexico)
Institutional Revolutionary Party politicians
People from Ciudad Madero
Autonomous University of Tamaulipas alumni
21st-century Mexican politicians
Deputies of the LIX Legislature of Mexico